Cédric Bah (born 11 May 1994) is an Ivorian professional basketball player for JA Vichy-Clermont Métropole Basket and the Ivorian national team.

He represented the Ivory Coast at the FIBA AfroBasket 2021, where the team won the silver medal.

References

External links

1994 births
Living people
ADA Blois Basket 41 players
Centers (basketball)
Ivorian expatriate basketball people in France
Ivorian men's basketball players
Sportspeople from Abidjan